The Dneper common shrew (Sorex averini) is a species of mammal in the family Soricidae.

References

Sorex
Mammals described in 1937